Monodonta glabrata is a species of sea snail, a marine gastropod mollusk in the family Trochidae, the top snails.

Description
The height of the shell attains 15 mm, its diameter 13 mm. The thick, smooth shell has a globose-conical shape. It is dark green, becoming black at times up to the apex and paler to the periphery. The shell contains seven convex whorls. The rounded-ovate aperture is large. The inner lip is sulcate. The columellar tooth is sharp and sulcate.

Distribution
This marine species occurs off China.

References

External links
 To Encyclopedia of Life
 To World Register of Marine Species

glabrata
Gastropods described in 1861